John Coulter Eastwood (March 7, 1908 – March 22, 1995) was a Canadian figure skater. He competed in two events at the 1928 Winter Olympics.

References

1908 births
1995 deaths
Figure skaters from Toronto
Olympic figure skaters of Canada
Figure skaters at the 1928 Winter Olympics
Canadian male pair skaters